The long-nosed peccary (Mylohyus nasutus) is an extinct mammal species of the peccary family (Tayassuidae). It is one of two peccary-species that existed in the US-Midwest during the last ice age.

Description 
The long-nosed peccary was about 0,75 m (2,5 ft) in height and 67 kg (148 lb) in weight. It had an elongated facial region and long slender legs.

Habitat and distribution 
During the last glacial, long-nosed peccaries were distributed throughout eastern North America with concentrations in Appalachia and Florida. Most fossil localities containing this species are found in the southern and south-eastern U.S., from west Texas to Florida, and north to Pennsylvania.

Ecology and behaviour 
Unlike the flat-headed peccary, the long-nosed peccary was probably a solitary animal and did not frequent caves.

References

Peccaries
Pleistocene mammals of North America
Pleistocene even-toed ungulates